Fernando Camilo Farias (born 9 March 1986), simply known as Camilo, is a Brazilian footballer who plays as an attacking midfielder for Mirassol.

Club career
After representing America-RJ and RS Futebol as a youth, Rio de Janeiro-born Camilo made his senior debut with Marília in 2006.

On 5 May 2008, after scoring five goals in the year's Campeonato Paulista, Camilo signed a three-year deal with Série A club Cruzeiro. He made his debut for the club on 4 September, coming on as a substitute for Ramires in a 3–1 away win against Vasco da Gama.

In May 2009 Camilo was loaned to fellow top tier club Grêmio Barueri, but had his loan cancelled early the following month. Another loan move to Primeira Liga side C.S. Marítimo followed, but the deal collapsed and on 26 August he was announced at Santo André, on a loan deal until the end of the year.

Camilo subsequently served loans at Ceará and América Mineiro before leaving Cruzeiro in 2011, after his contract expired. He subsequently signed for Nanchang Hengyuan in the Chinese Super League, but returned to Brazil on 19 January 2012 after joining Botafogo-SP.

On 12 August 2012, Camilo was presented at Avaí. After being sparingly used, he moved to Mirassol the following 12 December; with the latter he scored seven goals in only 18 matches during the 2013 Paulistão, including one in a 6–2 home routing of Palmeiras.

On 27 May 2013 Camilo joined Sport, contributing with three goals as his side achieved a top tier promotion. On 7 January of the following year, however, he returned to Botafogo-SP.

In April 2014, Camilo signed a short-term deal with Chapecoense for their first season in the main category. He became a mainstay in the club's midfield, and renewed his contract for a further year on 15 December.

On 24 September 2015, Camilo scored Chape's first international goal, netting the opener in a 1–1 away draw against Libertad. In December, he moved abroad for the first time in his career after signing for Al-Shabab.

In May 2016, Camilo rescinded with Al-Shabab, stating a desire to return to his homeland. Linked to his former club Chapecoense, he signed a three-year contract with Botafogo late in the month.

On 19 July 2017, Camilo transferred to Internacional. On 28 May 2019, he rescinded his contract, and returned to Chape two days later.

International career
On 19 January 2017, Camilo was called up by Tite for a friendly against Colombia. He made his full international debut six days later, replacing goalscorer Dudu in the 1–0 win at the Engenhão in his hometown.

Career statistics

Club

International

Honours
Cruzeiro
Campeonato Mineiro: 2009

Mirassol
Campeonato Brasileiro Série C: 2022

References

External links

1986 births
Living people
Footballers from Rio de Janeiro (city)
Brazilian footballers
Association football midfielders
Campeonato Brasileiro Série A players
Campeonato Brasileiro Série B players
Esporte Clube Vitória players
Cruzeiro Esporte Clube players
Ceará Sporting Club players
América Futebol Clube (MG) players
Botafogo Futebol Clube (SP) players
Avaí FC players
Mirassol Futebol Clube players
Sport Club do Recife players
Associação Chapecoense de Futebol players
Botafogo de Futebol e Regatas players
Sport Club Internacional players
Chinese Super League players
Shanghai Shenxin F.C. players
Saudi Professional League players
Al-Shabab FC (Riyadh) players
Brazil international footballers
Brazilian expatriate footballers
Brazilian expatriate sportspeople in China
Expatriate footballers in China
Brazilian expatriate sportspeople in Saudi Arabia
Expatriate footballers in Saudi Arabia